The New Testament apocrypha (singular apocryphon) are a number of writings by early Christians that give accounts of Jesus and his teachings, the nature of God, or the teachings of his apostles and of their lives. Some of these writings were cited as scripture by early Christians, but since the fifth century a widespread consensus has emerged limiting the New Testament to the 27 books of the modern canon. Roman Catholic, Eastern Orthodox, and Protestant churches generally do not view the New Testament apocrypha as part of the Bible.

Definition
The word "apocrypha" means "things put away" or "things hidden", originating from the Medieval Latin adjective , "secret" or "non-canonical", which in turn originated from the Greek adjective  (apokryphos), "obscure", from the verb  (apokryptein), "to hide away". From the Greek prefix "apo" which means "away" and the Greek verb "kryptein" which means "to hide". 

The general term is usually applied to the books that were considered by the church as useful, but not divinely inspired. As such, to refer to Gnostic writings as "apocryphal" is misleading since they would not be classified in the same category by orthodox believers. Often used by the Greek Fathers was the term antilegomena, or "spoken against", although some canonical books were also spoken against, such as the Apocalypse of John in the East. Often used by scholars is the term pseudepigrapha, or "falsely inscribed" or "falsely attributed", in the sense that the writings were written by an anonymous author who appended the name of an apostle to his work, such as in the Gospel of Peter or The Æthiopic Apocalypse of Enoch: almost all books, in both Old and New Testaments, called "apocrypha" in the Protestant tradition are pseudepigrapha. In the Catholic and Orthodox traditions, what are called the apocrypha by Protestants include the deuterocanonical books: in the Catholic tradition, the term "apocrypha" is synonymous with what Protestants would call the pseudepigrapha, the latter term of which is almost exclusively used by scholars.

History

Development of the New Testament canon

That some works are categorized as New Testament apocrypha is indicative of the wide range of responses that were engendered in the interpretation of the message of Jesus of Nazareth. During the first several centuries of the transmission of that message, considerable debate turned on safeguarding its authenticity. Three key methods of addressing this survive to the present day: ordination, where groups authorize individuals as reliable teachers of the message; creeds, where groups define the boundaries of interpretation of the message; and canons, which list the primary documents certain groups believe contain the message originally taught by Jesus. There was substantial debate about which books should be included in the canons. In general, those books that the majority regarded as the earliest books about Jesus were the ones included. Books that were not accepted into the canons are now termed apocryphal. Some of them were vigorously suppressed and survive only as fragments. The earliest lists of canonical works of the New Testament were not quite the same as modern lists; for example, the Book of Revelation was regarded as disputed by some Christians (see Antilegomena), while Shepherd of Hermas was considered genuine by others, and appears (after the Book of Revelation) in the Codex Sinaiticus.

The Syriac Peshitta, used by all the various Syrian Churches, originally did not include 2 Peter, 2 John, 3 John, Jude and Revelation (and this canon of 22 books is the one cited by John Chrysostom (~347–407) and Theodoret (393–466) from the School of Antioch). Western Syrians have added the remaining five books to their New Testament canons in modern times (such as the Lee Peshitta of 1823). Today, the official lectionaries followed by the Malankara Syrian Orthodox Church and the East Syriac Chaldean Catholic Church, which is in communion with the Holy See, still only present lessons from the 22 books of the original Peshitta.

The Armenian Apostolic church at times has included the Third Epistle to the Corinthians, but does not always list it with the other 27 canonical New Testament books. This church did not accept Revelation into its Bible until 1200 CE. The New Testament of the Coptic Bible, adopted by the Egyptian Church, includes the two Epistles of Clement.

Modern scholarship and translation
English translations were made in the early 18th century by William Wake and by  Jeremiah Jones, and collected in 1820 by William Hone's Apocryphal New Testament. The series Ante-Nicene Fathers, vol. 8, contains translations by Alexander Walker. New translations by M. R. James appeared in 1924, and were revised by J.K. Eliott, The Apocryphal New Testament, Oxford University Press, 1991. The "standard" scholarly edition of the New Testament Apocrypha in German is that of Schneemelcher, and in English its translation by Robert McLachlan Wilson.

Constantin von Tischendorf and other scholars began to study New Testament apocrypha seriously in the 19th century and produce new translations. The texts of the Nag Hammadi library are often considered separately but the current edition of Schneemelcher also contains eleven Nag Hammadi texts.

Books that are known objectively not to have existed in antiquity are usually not considered part of the New Testament apocrypha. Among these are the Libellus de Nativitate Sanctae Mariae (also called the "Nativity of Mary") and the Latin Infancy gospel. The latter two did not exist in antiquity, and they seem to be based on the earlier Infancy gospels.

Gospels

Canonical gospels 
Four gospels came to be accepted as part of the New Testament canon.

 Gospel according to Matthew
 Gospel according to Mark
 Gospel according to Luke
 Gospel according to John

Infancy gospels

The rarity of information about the childhood of Jesus in the canonical gospels led to a hunger of early Christians for more detail about the early life of Jesus. This was supplied by a number of 2nd-century and later texts, known as infancy gospels, none of which were accepted into the biblical canon, but some scholars have noted that the very number of surviving infancy manuscripts attests to their continued popularity.

Most of these were based on the earliest infancy gospels, namely the Infancy Gospel of James (also called the "Protoevangelium of James") and Infancy Gospel of Thomas, and on their later combination into the Gospel of Pseudo-Matthew (also called the "Infancy Gospel of Matthew" or "Birth of Mary and Infancy of the Saviour").

The other significant early infancy gospels are the Syriac Infancy Gospel, the History of Joseph the Carpenter, Life of John the Baptist.

Jewish-Christian gospels

The Jewish–Christian Gospels were gospels of a Jewish Christian character quoted by Clement of Alexandria, Origen, Eusebius, Epiphanius, Jerome and probably Didymus the Blind. Most modern scholars have concluded that there was one gospel in Aramaic/Hebrew and at least two in Greek, although a minority argue that there were only two, Aramaic/Hebrew and Greek.

None of these gospels survives today, but attempts have been made to reconstruct them from references in the Church Fathers. The reconstructed texts of the gospels are usually categorized under New Testament Apocrypha. The standard edition of Schneemelcher describes the texts of three Jewish–Christian gospels as follows:
1) The Gospel of the Ebionites ("GE") – 7 quotations by Epiphanius.
2) The Gospel of the Hebrews ("GH") – 1 quotation ascribed to Cyril of Jerusalem, plus GH 2–7 quotations by Clement, Origen, and Jerome.
3) The Gospel of the Nazarenes ("GN") – GN 1 to GN 23 are mainly from Jerome; GN 24 to GN 36 are from medieval sources.

Some scholars consider that the two last named are in fact the same source.

Non-canonical gospels

 Gospel of Marcion (mid-2nd century)
 Gospel of Mani (3rd century)
 Gospel of Apelles (midlate 2nd century)
 Gospel of Bardesanes (late 2ndearly 3rd century)
 Gospel of Basilides (mid-2nd century)
 Gospel of Thomas (2nd century; sayings gospel)

Passion Gospels

A number of gospels are concerned specifically with the "Passion" (from the Latin verb patior, passus sum; "to suffer, bear, endure", from which also "patience, patient", etc.)) of Jesus:
 Gospel of Peter
 Gospel of Nicodemus (also called the "Acts of Pilate")
 Pseudo-Cyril of Jerusalem, On the Life and the Passion of Christ
 Gospel of Bartholomew
 Questions of Bartholomew
 Book of the Resurrection of Jesus Christ, by Bartholomew the Apostle

Although three texts take Bartholomew's name, it may be that one of the Questions of Bartholomew or the Resurrection of Jesus Christ is in fact the unknown Gospel of Bartholomew.

Harmonized gospels
A number of texts aim to provide a single harmonization of the canonical gospels, that eliminates discordances among them by presenting a unified text derived from them to some degree. The most widely read of these was the Diatessaron.

Gnostic texts

In the modern era, many Gnostic texts have been uncovered, especially from the Nag Hammadi library. Some texts take the form of an expounding of the esoteric cosmology and ethics held by the Gnostics. Often this was in the form of dialogue in which Jesus expounds esoteric knowledge while his disciples raise questions concerning it. There is also a text, known as the Epistula Apostolorum, which is a polemic against Gnostic esoterica, but written in a similar style as the Gnostic texts.

Dialogues with Jesus
Apocryphon of James (also called the "Secret Book of James")
Book of Thomas the Contender
Dialogue of the Saviour
Gospel of Judas (also called the "Gospel of Judas Iscariot")
Gospel of Mary
Gospel of Philip
Greek Gospel of the Egyptians (distinct from the Coptic Gospel of the Egyptians)
The Sophia of Jesus Christ

General texts concerning Jesus
Coptic Apocalypse of Paul (distinct from the Apocalypse of Paul)
Gospel of Truth
Gnostic Apocalypse of Peter (distinct from the Apocalypse of Peter)
Letter of Lentulus
Pistis Sophia
Second Treatise of the Great Seth

Sethian texts concerning Jesus
The Sethians were a gnostic group who originally worshipped the biblical Seth as a messianic figure, later treating Jesus as a re-incarnation of Seth. They produced numerous texts expounding their esoteric cosmology, usually in the form of visions:

Apocryphon of John (also called the "Secret Gospel of John")
Coptic Gospel of the Egyptians (distinct from the Greek Gospel of the Egyptians)
Trimorphic Protennoia

Ritual diagrams
Some of the Gnostic texts appear to consist of diagrams and instructions for use in religious rituals:
Ophite Diagrams
Books of Jeu

Acts

Several texts concern themselves with the subsequent lives of the apostles, usually with highly supernatural events. Almost half of these, anciently called The Circuits of the Apostles and now known by the name of their purported author, "Leucius Charinus" (supposedly a companion of John the apostle), contained the Acts of Peter, John, Andrew, Thomas, and Paul. These were judged by the Patriarch Photios I of Constantinople in the ninth century to be full of folly, self-contradiction, falsehood, and impiety. The Acts of Thomas and the Acts of Peter and the Twelve are often considered Gnostic texts. While most of the texts are believed to have been written in the 2nd century, at least two, the Acts of Barnabas and the Acts of Peter and Paul are believed to have been written as late as the 5th century.

 Acts of Andrew
 Acts of Barnabas
 Acts of John
 Acts of Mar Mari
 Acts of the Martyrs
 Acts of Paul
 Acts of Paul and Thecla
 Acts of Peter
 Acts of Peter and Andrew
 Acts of Peter and Paul
 Acts of Peter and the Twelve
 Acts of Philip
 Acts of Pilate
 Acts of Thomas
 Acts of Timothy
 Acts of Xanthippe, Polyxena, and Rebecca
 The Lost Chapter of the Acts of the Apostles

Epistles

There are also non-canonical epistles (or "letters") between individuals or to Christians in general. Some of them were regarded very highly by the early church.
Those marked with a lozenge  (♦) are included in the collection known as the Apostolic Fathers:

Epistle of Barnabas ♦
Epistles of Clement ♦
Epistle of Ignatius to the Smyrnaeans ♦
Epistle of Ignatius to the Trallians ♦
Epistle of Polycarp to the Philippians ♦
Epistle to Diognetus ♦
Epistle to the Laodiceans (an epistle in the name of Paul)
Epistle to Seneca the Younger (an epistle in the name of Paul)
Third Epistle to the Corinthians - accepted in the past by some in the Armenian Orthodox church.

Apocalypses

Several works frame themselves as visions, often discussing the future, afterlife, or both:

Apocalypse of Paul (distinct from the Coptic Apocalypse of Paul, also called Apocalypse of the Virgin.)
Apocalypse of Peter (distinct from the Gnostic Apocalypse of Peter)
Apocalypse of Pseudo-Methodius
Apocalypse of Thomas (also called the Revelation of Thomas)
Apocalypse of Stephen (also called the Revelation of Stephen)
First Apocalypse of James (also called the First Revelation of James)
Second Apocalypse of James (also called the Second Revelation of James)
Second Apocalypse of John (also called the [First] Apocryphal Apocalypse of John)
The Shepherd of Hermas  (also included in the collection known as the Apostolic Fathers)

Fate of Mary
Several texts (over 50) consist of descriptions of the events surrounding the varied fate of Mary (the mother of Jesus):

The Home Going of Mary
The Falling Asleep of the Mother of God
The Descent of Mary

Miscellany
These texts, due to their content or form, do not fit into the other categories:

Apostolic Constitutions (church regulations supposedly asserted by the apostles)
Book of Nepos
Canons of the Apostles
Cave of Treasures (also called The Treasure)
Clementine literature
Didache (possibly the first written catechism) (also included in the collection known as the Apostolic Fathers.)
Liturgy of St James
Penitence of Origen
Prayer of Paul
Sentences of Sextus
Physiologus
Book of the Bee

Fragments
In addition to the known apocryphal works, there are also small fragments of texts, parts of unknown (or uncertain) works. Some of the more significant fragments are:

The Gospel of the Saviour
The Naassene Fragment
The Fayyum Fragment
The Secret Gospel of Mark, whose authenticity has been challenged
The Oxyrhynchus Gospels
The Egerton Gospel

Lost works 
Several texts are mentioned in many ancient sources and would probably be considered part of the apocrypha, but no known text has survived:

Gospel of Eve (a quotation from this gospel is given by Epiphanius (Haer. xxvi. 2, 3). It is possible that this is the Gospel of Perfection he alludes to in xxvi. 2. The quotation shows that this gospel was the expression of complete pantheism)
Gospel of the Four Heavenly Realms
Gospel of Matthias (probably different from the Gospel of Matthew)
Gospel of Perfection (used by the followers of Basilides and other Gnostics. See Epiphanius, Haer. xxvi. 2)
Gospel of the Seventy
Gospel of Thaddaeus (this may be a synonym for the Gospel of Judas, confusing Judas Iscariot for Jude the Apostle)
Gospel of the Twelve
Memoria Apostolorum

Close candidates for canonization 
While many of the books listed here were considered heretical (especially those belonging to the gnostic tradition—as this sect was considered heretical by Proto-orthodox Christianity of the early centuries), others were not considered particularly heretical in content, but in fact were well accepted as significant spiritual works. Those marked with a lozenge (♦) are also included in the collection known as the Apostolic Fathers.

While some of the following works appear in complete Bibles from the fourth century, such as 1 Clement and The Shepherd of Hermas, showing their general popularity, they were not included when the canon was formally decided at the end of that century.

1 and 2 Clement  ♦
Shepherd of Hermas  ♦
Didache ♦
Epistle of Barnabas ♦
Apocalypse of Peter
Third Epistle to the Corinthians

Evaluation

Present day 
Among historians of early Christianity the books are considered invaluable, especially those that almost made it into the final canon, such as Shepherd of Hermas. Bart Ehrman, for example, said:

The victors in the struggles to establish Christian Orthodoxy not only won their theological battles, they also rewrote the history of the conflict; later readers then naturally assumed that the victorious views had been embraced by the vast majority of Christians from the very beginning ... The practice of Christian forgery has a long and distinguished history ... the debate lasted three hundred years ... even within "orthodox" circles there was considerable debate concerning which books to include.

Historical development towards today's canon 
The historical debate primarily concerned whether certain works should be read in the church service or only privately. These works were widely used but not necessarily considered Catholic or 'universal.' Such works include the Didache, Shepherd of Hermas, 1 Clement, 2 Clement, the Epistle of Barnabas, and to a lesser extent the Apocalypse of Peter.

Considering the generally accepted dates of authorship for all of the canonical New Testament works (ca. 100 CE), as well as the various witnesses to canonicity extant among the writings of Ignatius, Polycarp, Irenaeus, etc., the four gospels and letters of Paul were held by the gentile Christian community as scriptural, and 200 years were needed to finalize the canon; from the beginning of the 2nd Century to the mid-4th Century, no book in the final canon was ever declared spurious or heretical, except for the Revelation of John which the Council of Laodicea in 363–364 CE rejected (although it accepted all of the other 26 books in the New Testament). This was possibly due to fears of the influence of Montanism which used the book extensively to support their theology. See Revelation of John for more details.

Athanasius wrote his Easter letter in 367 CE which defined a canon of 27 books, identical to the current canon, but also listed two works that were "not in the canon but to be read:" The Shepherd of Hermas and the Didache. Nevertheless, the early church leaders in the 3rd and 4th Centuries generally distinguished between canonical works and those that were not canonical but 'useful,' or 'good for teaching,' though never relegating any of the final 27 books to the latter category. One aim with establishing the canon was to capture only those works which were held to have been written by the Apostles, or their close associates, and as the Muratorian fragment canon (ca. 150–175 CE) states concerning the Shepherd of Hermas:

...But Hermas wrote The Shepherd very recently, in our times, in the city of Rome, while bishop Pius, his brother, was occupying the chair of the church of the city of Rome. And therefore it ought indeed to be read; but it cannot be read publicly to the people in church either among the Prophets, whose number is complete, or among the Apostles, for it is after their time.

Published collections

See also 
 Apostolic Fathers
 Authorship of the Pauline epistles
 Biblical apocrypha
 Biblical canon
 Books of the Bible
 List of early Christian writers
 History of Christianity
 Historicity of Jesus
 List of Gospels
 Nag Hammadi library
 The Q document, a hypothetical document underlying much of the text of the canonical gospels of Matthew and Luke
 Textual criticism

References

Sources 
 
 
 
 
 
 
  (6th German edition, translated by George Ogg)

External links
New Testament Apocrypha texts
New Testament Apocrypha resources
New Testament Apocrypha histories
New Testament Apocrypha - Tabulation includes Gnostic Gospels (23) and Gnostic Acts (29), linked to English translations.
 

 

fi:Apokryfiset kirjat